Newlands may refer to:

Places

Australia 
 Newlands, Queensland, a locality in the Whitsunday Region

New Zealand
 Newlands, Wellington, a suburb of Wellington

South Africa
 Newlands, Cape Town, a suburb of Cape Town
 Newlands, Johannesburg, a suburb of Johannesburg
 Newlands, Pretoria, a suburb of Pretoria
Newlands East, a township near Durban
Newlands West, a township near Durban

United Kingdom

England
 Newlands, Allerdale, Cumbria, in Above Derwent
 Newlands Valley, a valley in Cumbria
 Newlands, Eden, Cumbria, in Castle Sowerby
 Newlands, Derbyshire, a location

 Newlands, Hampshire
 Newlands, Northumberland, a location
 Newlands, Nottinghamshire, a location
 Newlands, Staffordshire, a location
 Newlands Corner in Surrey

Northern Ireland
 Newlands, County Antrim, a townland in County Antrim

Scotland
 Newlands, Dumfries and Galloway, a location
 Newlands, Glasgow, an area of Glasgow
 Newlands, Highland, a location
 Newlands, Roxburghshire, a location in the Scottish Borders
 Newlands, Scottish Borders, Peebleshire

Zimbabwe
 Newlands, Harare, a neighbourhood in the Eastern suburbs of Harare

Other uses
 Newlands (surname)
 Newlands Cricket Ground, a cricket ground in Cape Town, South Africa
 Newlands House, a listed building in Bridgend, Scotland
 Newlands Stadium, a rugby and football stadium in Cape Town, South Africa
 Newlands Girls' School, Maidenhead, England
 Agnes Keith House, formerly known as Newlands, Sandakan, Borneo

See also
 Newlands Resolution
 Newland (disambiguation)
 New Land (disambiguation)
 New states (disambiguation)
 New Country (disambiguation)